Hoplojana indecisa is a moth in the family Eupterotidae. It was described by Per Olof Christopher Aurivillius in 1901 and is found in Malawi and Tanzania.

References

Janinae
Moths described in 1901